Henri Morel may refer to:

Henri Morel (Canadian politician) (1867–1934), Ontario butcher and political figure
Henri Morel (Swiss politician) (1838–1912), President of the Swiss National Council